Prunus brigantina, called Briançon apricot, Briançon plum, marmot plum, and Alpine apricot, is a wild tree species native to France and Italy. Its fruit is edible and similar to the commercial apricot P. armeniaca, but it is smooth unlike apricots. An edible oil produced from the seed, 'huile des marmottes', is used in France.

It is disputed whether P. brigantina is an apricot or a plum. It is grouped with plum species according to chloroplast DNA sequences, but more closely related to apricot species according to nuclear DNA sequences.

References

External links

 

brigantina
brigantina
Apricots
Flora of France
Flora of Italy
Plants described in 1786